Xiwengzhuang Town is a town located in the Miyun District of Beijing, China. Situated on the southwest of the Miyun Reservoir, it borders Shicheng and Bulaotun Towns to the north, Mujiayu Town to the east, Miyun Town to the south, and Xitiangezhuang Town to the west. In the year 2020, its population was 20,438.

This town got the name Xiwengzhuang due to its government being located in Xiwengzhuang Village.

History

Administrative divisions 
The table below lists all 22 subdivisions of Xiwengzhuang Town by the end of 2021, including 8 communities and 14 villages:

Gallery

See also 
 List of township-level divisions of Beijing

References

Miyun District
Towns in Beijing